John Desmond "Dekker" Curry (born 20 December 1966) is an Irish former cricketer. A left-handed batsman and right-arm off-break bowler, he made his debut for the Ireland cricket team against an England Amateur team in July 1992, and went on to represent Ireland on 50 occasions, his last game coming against Scotland in the 2001 ICC Trophy.

Of his matches for Ireland, two were first-class matches against Scotland and eight had List A status. In all matches for Ireland, he scored 1193 runs, his top score (and only century) coming against the Earl of Arundel's XI in June 2001, when he scored exactly 100. He also took 33 wickets, his best bowling being 3/28 against the USA in the 1997 ICC Trophy.

He was man of the match in Ireland's famous win over Middlesex in the 1997 Benson & Hedges Cup.

He represented Ireland in the ICC Trophy in 1994, 1997 and 2001, and at the 1996 European Championship. He also represented Northern Ireland in the cricket tournament at the 1998 Commonwealth Games.

References

1966 births
Living people
Irish cricketers
Cricketers from Northern Ireland
Cricketers at the 1998 Commonwealth Games
People from County Tyrone
Irish cricket captains
Commonwealth Games competitors for Northern Ireland